Bogatan-Phudsil is a Gaupalika in Doti District in the Sudurpashchim Province of far-western Nepal. Bogatan-Phudsil has a population of 17902.The land area is 300.22 km2. It was formed by merging Simchaur, Kedar Akhada, Kanachaur, Satfari, Dhirkamandau, Gakuda and Chawarachautra VDCs.

References

Rural municipalities in Doti District
Rural municipalities of Nepal established in 2017